Kervin Marc (born 9 January 1975, in Mon Repos, Saint Lucia) is a Black British artist and designer who had an early career as a professional English cricketer playing as first-class cricket, notably for Middlesex County Cricket Club and Central Districts cricket team in New Zealand. As of 2020, he has established himself as a fashion outlier migrating from a stall in Spitalfields Market to his own studio boutique on West London’s Westbourne Grove.

References

1975 births
Living people
English cricketers
Berkshire cricketers
Central Districts cricketers
Middlesex cricketers
Hertfordshire cricketers
Surrey Cricket Board cricketers
Middlesex Cricket Board cricketers
British Universities cricketers